Yourdrive is a New Zealand peer-to-peer carsharing company that no longer runs any business operations. Prior to ceasing operations it facilitated a system in which individuals may rent their privately owned vehicles on an hourly, daily or weekly basis to other registered users of the service. Owners set their rental prices and earn a 60 percent commission from the rental revenue. Prior to going out of business it operated throughout New Zealand with vehicles in Auckland, Hamilton, Palmerston North, Wellington, Christchurch, Queenstown and Dunedin.

New Zealand rental car firm JUCY purchased 50% of the company in 2016

Peer-to-peer carsharing is an example of collaborative consumption, where assets and skills are shared or traded between neighbours for sustainability and economic benefit. Although car sharing is relatively new in New Zealand it is an area that is being encouraged due to the environmental and economic benefits. Auckland Transport is promoting a scheme that would drastically increase the number of car sharing vehicles.

In March 2020 Yourdrive announced that it had ceased all operations due to lack of revenue.

See also

Peer-to-peer car rental
Collaborative consumption
Carsharing
Alternatives to the automobile
Car Rental

References

External links

Transport companies established in 2014
Carsharing
Companies based in Auckland
Peer-to-peer
Online marketplaces of New Zealand